Carne de presidio (English: Meat in Prison) is a 1952 Mexican film. It was written by Luis Alcoriza.

External links
 

1952 films
1950s prison films
1950s Spanish-language films
Mexican crime drama films
1952 crime drama films
Mexican black-and-white films
Prison drama films
1950s Mexican films